The Second Roller In-line Hockey World Championship was the second such event organized by the Fédération Internationale de Roller Skating. It was hosted by Italy in Roccaraso. Ten national teams competed in one venue, the Roccaraso Palaghiaccio. The competition also served as qualifications for the third competition.

The United States, for the second consecutive year, went undefeated throughout the championship and captured its second gold medal by defeating France 7–1 in the final. Italy captured the bronze medal with a 6–0 victory over Austria.

Host selection
The venue listed as host for the inline hockey teams was the Roccaraso Palaghiaccio "G Bolino".

Venues

Rosters
Each team's roster consists of at least 6 skaters (forwards and defencemen) and two goaltenders, and at most 14 skaters and two goaltenders. All twelve participating nations, through the confirmation of their respective national associations, have to submit a roster by the start of the competition.

Format
The ten teams were divided into two pools of which the four best in each advanced to the medal round. There they met cross-over as indicated in the section below. The remaining teams played additional matches to determine their overall championship position.

In the round robin pool play, points were awarded as follows:

2 points for a win (W)
1 point for a tie (T)
0 points for a loss (L)
–2 points for a forfeit (F)
If two or more teams finished with an equal number of points during pool play, the team's position is determined by the following tiebreaking formula:
The victor of the head-to-head competition
The lowest total of goals allowed in common wins among the tied teams
A shootout will take place.

Final ranking: places 1–4 were determined by the medal games. Places 5–10 were determined by the 5/10 placement round.

Pool play

All times are local (UTC+2).

Pool A

Pool B

Medal round

Note: Teams eliminated in the quarterfinals advance to the 5 through 10 placement round.

All times are local (UTC+2).

5 through 10 placement round

All times are local (UTC+2).

9th place game

7th place game

5th place game

Ranking and statistics

Final ranking
The official FIRS final ranking of the tournament:

Scoring leaders
List shows the top skaters sorted by points, then goals.

Source:

See also 
 FIRS Inline Hockey World Championships
 List of FIRS Senior Men's Inline Hockey World Championships medalists

References

External links 
 Fédération Internationale de Roller Sports
 Comité International Roller In-Line Hockey

Inline hockey tournaments
1996 in inline hockey